The Demerara Harbour Bridge is a  long floating toll bridge. It was commissioned on 2 July 1978. There is a pedestrian footwalk. A raised section lets small vessels pass under. A retractor span lets large vessels pass.

The bridge has 61 spans.

The number vehicles transiting per day was approximately 9,000 in 2015, and 14,000 .

Although the bridge was designed to last ten years, it has been so successful that it has inspired the Berbice Bridge, completed in 2008.

History
Construction of the Demerara Harbour Bridge began on 29 May 1976. The basic design was by Capt. John Patrick Coghlan, with construction assistance was provided by the British Government. The bridge was only designed to last 10 years, yet it is still in use. Tolls are collected only in east-to-west travel even though the bridge handles one lane of traffic in each direction.

On Monday 23 July 2012 at 06:45 Span 61, the western retractor span collapsed during maintenance work, causing it to partly sink, trapping a minibus. No injuries resulted but as all the larger ferries are decommissioned it caused major disruption.

Management
The Demerara Harbour Bridge is managed by the Management and Monitoring Unit, Demerara Harbour Bridge Rehabilitation Project (MMU), a subsidiary of the Ministry of Public Works (MPW). MMU, however functions independently of the MPW, and maintains a full staff responsible for maintenance, management, construction and operation. MMU also maintains financial independence based on revenue earned from tolls (vehicle and water-borne vessels). They have a staff of about 60 people.

New Demerara River Bridge 
In December 2015 tenders were received from twenty-three international and local companies for a new bridge. In August 2017 plans were announced to construct a new bridge two kilometres north of the existing bridge, linking Houston on the eastern bank to Versailles on the western bank. However, breaches in procurement due to "unsolicited proposals" delayed plans. In 2020, a new request for bid was issued, with proposed connection between Nandy Park to the east and Meer Zorgen/La Grange to the west.

See also
 List of bridges in Guyana

References

External links 

 Official website of the Demerara Harbour Bridge Corp.
 

1978 establishments in South America
Bridges completed in 1978
Road bridges in Guyana
Pontoon bridges
Retractable bridges
Toll bridges